Jonathan St-Pierre (born September 15, 1983) is a former professional Canadian football offensive lineman. He was drafted by the Saskatchewan Roughriders in the second round of the 2008 CFL Draft. St-Pierre played college football for the Illinois State Redbirds. He was traded to the Toronto Argonauts on January 6, 2010, for non-import wide receiver Obed Cétoute.

On September 5, 2012, St-Pierre was released by the Toronto Argonauts. On September 25 he signed onto the practice roster of the Calgary Stampeders.

St-Pierre retired from professional football on January 30, 2013.

References

External links
Calgary Stampeders bio
Toronto Argonauts bio
Saskatchewan Roughriders bio

1983 births
Living people
Sportspeople from Longueuil
Players of Canadian football from Quebec
Canadian football offensive linemen
Illinois State Redbirds football players
Saskatchewan Roughriders players
Toronto Argonauts players
Calgary Stampeders players